is a Japanese professional baseball outfielder for the Tokyo Yakult Swallows of Nippon Professional Baseball (NPB). He previously played for the Milwaukee Brewers, Kansas City Royals, San Francisco Giants, Seattle Mariners, Houston Astros, Toronto Blue Jays and New York Mets of Major League Baseball (MLB).

Aoki is one of only six players, alongside Ichiro Suzuki, Matt Murton, Alex Ramirez, Tsuyoshi Nishioka, and Shogo Akiyama, to amass 200 or more hits in a single season in Japanese professional baseball, and the only individual to do so in two separate seasons. He played in the 2006 and 2009 World Baseball Classics as well as the 2008 Beijing Olympics, and represented Japan in the 2017 World Baseball Classic.

Early life and amateur career
Aoki was born in Hyūga, Miyazaki, and attended Hyuga Municipal Hichiya Elementary School and Tomishima Junior High School before going on to Miyazaki Prefectural Hyuga High School. Surprisingly, he was a pitcher throughout junior high and high school, converting to the outfield only upon entering Waseda University where he majored in human sciences.

Aoki was surrounded by a remarkable concentration of talent at Waseda: his year included shortstop Takashi Toritani (currently with the Chiba Lotte Marines), third baseman Toshimitsu Higa (Hiroshima Toyo Carp) and center fielder Shintaro Yoshida (Orix Buffaloes), all three of whom would later go on to the pros. Left-handed pitcher Tsuyoshi Wada (Fukuoka Softbank Hawks) was one year his senior, and second baseman Hiroyasu Tanaka and first baseman Shinichi Takeuchi, both of whom would later rejoin Aoki with the Swallows, were one and two years his junior, respectively.

The six hitters, who often batted in the order of Tanaka, Aoki, Toritani, Higa, Takeuchi and Yoshida, formed one of the most potent lineups in college baseball history and led Waseda to four consecutive Tokyo Big6 titles for the first time in the history of the university. Aoki hit .463 in the spring of his junior year (2002) and set a Tokyo Big6 record for runs scored in a single game with six in a game against the University of Tokyo that season, going 5-for-5 with five RBI and a walk in that same game. He hit .332 during his college career, albeit without a single home run, and was selected to the Tokyo Big6 Best Nine Award three times in his eight seasons (spring and fall) with Waseda as the starting right fielder. He was selected in the fourth round of the 2003 NPB amateur draft by the Yakult Swallows.

Professional career

Yakult Swallows

In 2004, Aoki saw little playing time in his rookie season (2004), playing just 10 games at the ichigun (Japanese equivalent of "major league") level. However, he showed signs of promise in the minors, hitting .372 and leading the Eastern League in both batting average and on-base percentage (.436) and coming second in stolen bases (21). In the Fresh All-Star Game (the Japanese equivalent of the All-Star Futures Game) held that year, Aoki went 4-for-5, coming a home run short of the cycle and winning Most Valuable Player honors for the game.

In 2005, Aoki enjoyed a breakout year, earning the job of starting center fielder with the departure of Atsunori Inaba. While he struggled in the opening weeks of the season as the Swallows' No. 2 hitter, striking out uncharacteristically often, he slowly began to collect hits at his usual pace and was promoted to the leadoff role by June 2005. On October 6, 2005, he tied the Central League single-season hit record of 192 (set by Robert Rose in 1999), following up the feat by becoming the second player in NPB history (after Ichiro Suzuki) to record 200 hits in a single season, on October 11, 2005.

While Aoki missed Suzuki's NPB record for hits in a single season of 210, he finished with a league-record 202 hits (his 169 singles were an NPB single-season record). He led all Central League players in batting average (.344) and hits, and was voted the league Most Valuable Rookie.

In 2006, Aoki was chosen to play in the inaugural World Baseball Classic as a member of the Japanese national team in 2006. He made his second All-Star appearance in July 2006 and was named the Most Valuable Player in Game 1 (held at his home park, Meiji Jingu Stadium), becoming the fourth player in NPB history to win both Fresh All-Star Game and All-Star Game MVP honors.

Though he came up short in his goal of reaching 200 base hits and winning the batting title for the second consecutive year, Aoki finished the season with 192 hits, leading both the Central and Pacific leagues. He cut down on his strikeouts and drew more walks than in the previous season, improving his on-base percentage from .387 to .396 despite a lower batting average. He also hit more home runs (13) and drove in more runs (62), leading the league in both average with runners in scoring position (.399) and stolen bases (41) for the first time (and putting an end to Tiger center fielder Norihiro Akahoshi's five-year streak of leading the Central League in that category).

On December 25, 2006, Aoki publicly stated his intent to eventually play in the major leagues via the posting system, saying, "…I would like to move to the majors after some years. It might be difficult to do so as a free agent since I'll be over 30 by then." While major league teams expressed interest in Aoki (especially after seeing him in international play), the Swallows offered no indication of their willingness to comply with the request.

In 2007, Aoki and teammate and fellow outfielder Alex Ramírez competed for the batting title at a torrid pace throughout the 2007 season. On July 10, 2007, Aoki became the fastest player in Japanese professional baseball history to amass 500 career hits, doing so in 373 games. While he fell short of 200 base hits, partly due to the 80 walks (fourth in the league) that opposing pitchers issued to him, he finished second in the league in hits (to Ramírez, who hit safely 204 times, a new Central League record) with 193, winning his second batting title with a .346 average. Aoki also led the league in on-base percentage for the first time and scored 114 runs (his third consecutive season with 100 or more runs).

Meanwhile, his stolen base total dropped sharply from 41 to 17, a decline that could be attributed to then-player-manager Atsuya Furuta's placing Hiroyasu Tanaka (rather than Adam Riggs, as was the case in 2006), a second baseman with little power, behind Aoki in the 2-hole and instructing him to bunt often. On the other hand, Aoki began to show legitimate power, hitting 20 home runs and slugged over .500 for the first time. He was slotted into both the 2- and 3-hole numerous times and even hit cleanup in Furuta's retirement game as a player on October 7, 2007.

Aoki played in the Asian Baseball Championship as a member of the Japanese national team in December 2007, helping Japan clinch a berth in the upcoming Beijing Olympics.

On May 5, 2008, Aoki was scratched from the lineup and sent down to the minors due to an oblique strain. It was his first time missing playing time due to injury since his debut at the ichigun level. However, he returned some three weeks later on May 29, 2008, engaging in another race for the batting title, this time with Yokohama BayStars left fielder Seiichi Uchikawa.

In August 2008, Aoki was chosen to play in the 2008 Beijing Olympics along with teammate Shinya Miyamoto as a member of the Japanese national team. After he returned to the Swallows, manager Shigeru Takada opted to use him in the 3-hole permanently, slotting newly acquired left fielder Kazuki Fukuchi into the leadoff role instead. While Aoki relinquished the league lead in both batting average and on-base percentage to Uchikawa, he finished the season with a personal-best batting average of .347, striking out just 47 times (fewest in the league among qualifying players) and swiping 31 bases (second to Fukuchi on the Swallows).

In 2009, Though he hit well in the second World Baseball Classic, Aoki struggled in the opening weeks of the 2009 season, hitting just .233 with a .316 on-base percentage in April 2009. He got hit in the head by a pitch thrown by Chunichi Dragons closer Hitoki Iwase on April 30, 2009, but was found to have no serious injuries upon diagnosis.

Milwaukee Brewers
The Swallows posted Aoki to Major League Baseball in the 2011–12 offseason. The Milwaukee Brewers won the posting and signed Aoki in January 2012 to a two-year contract with a third-year option. He became the team's first Japanese player to be acquired through this process. Kosuke Inaji served as Aoki's interpreter throughout the season.

Aoki's playing time greatly increased over the course of the season due to his fine play and the injuries sustained by many starters. In his first full season with Milwaukee, Aoki hit .288/.355/.433 with 10 home runs (one inside the park), 50 RBIs, and 81 runs scored in 520 at-bats, plus 30 stolen bases. By the latter half of the season, he was batting primarily in the leadoff position for the Brewers. Aoki also set the record for doubles in a single season (37) by a Brewers rookie.

On June 7, 2012, in a game against the Chicago Cubs, Aoki hit his first out of the park home run in his MLB career. He then hit a second home run in the bottom of the tenth inning, breaking a 3–3 tie. It was his first career walk-off, and his first career multi-home run game. During the later portion of the season, Aoki has started to become a spark plug for the Brewers. He made great defensive plays and got big hits when they were needed, including a 2-out, 2-strike, 2-run home run on September 9, 2012, against St. Louis to tie the game and send it to extra innings. This game was needed by the Brewers to help push them toward a possible Wild Card berth.

On June 24, 2012, Aoki collected 3 hits and 4 stolen bases against the Chicago White Sox. The 4 stolen bases tied the Brewers franchise record.

In 151 games in 2012, he hit .288 with 10 home runs, 50 RBI, 37 doubles, 30 stolen bases (9th in the NL), and 43 walks, giving him a .355 on-base percentage. He finished 5th in the NL Rookie of the Year voting.

Aoki was the Brewers Opening Day right fielder and leadoff hitter in 2013, and Logan Schafer was his main backup. In May 2013, he hit .343 with 6 RBI, bringing his season average to .299. After that, he had a steady decline until September 2013, when he hit .297 with 6 RBI and 15 walks. In 155 games, he hit .286 with 8 home runs, 37 RBI, 20 stolen bases and 55 walks, giving him a .356 on-base percentage.

Kansas City Royals

On December 5, 2013, the Brewers traded Aoki to the Kansas City Royals for Will Smith. Aoki batted leadoff for the Royals for much of the 2014 season. For the season, he batted .285/.349/.360, in 491 at bats.

On August 6, 2014, in a game against the Arizona Diamondbacks, Aoki hit a grand slam in the fifth inning off of relief pitcher Bo Schultz. This was his first career grand slam, as well as his first (and only) homer with the Royals. Aoki also set a Royals franchise record, which was the most hits in a three-game series. He collected a total of 11 hits against the Chicago White Sox at Kauffman Stadium, passing Willie Wilson and George Brett's former record of 10 hits.

San Francisco Giants
On January 19, 2015, Aoki signed a one-year deal with the San Francisco Giants. On May 3, 2015, in a 5–0 win over the Los Angeles Angels of Anaheim, Aoki led off the first inning with a solo home run against pitcher Jered Weaver. Following Aoki was teammate Joe Panik batting second, who homered as well. It was the first time since  that the Giants had opened a game with consecutive home runs.

On June 20, 2015, Aoki was hit by a pitch from Dodger Carlos Frias, breaking his right fibula and putting him on the disabled list, resulting in him missing 28 games. At the time he was batting .317 and was a potential All-Star, leading the league in several offensive categories. Two weeks after his return on July 27, 2015, he was again hit by a pitch, this time in the batting helmet by Chicago Cubs pitcher Jake Arrieta. He went on the 7-day concussion list, missing another seven games.

In 2015, he batted .287/.353/.380 in 355 at bats. After the 2015 season, the Giants declined Aoki's option, making him a free agent.

Seattle Mariners
On December 3, 2015, Aoki signed a one-year, $5.5 million contract with the Seattle Mariners.

In 2016, he batted .283/.349/.388, in 417 at bats.

Houston Astros

The Houston Astros claimed Aoki off waivers from the Mariners on November 3, 2016.

On June 11, 2017, Aoki recorded his 2000th career professional hit against the Los Angeles Angels of Anaheim. This includes hits in NPB and MLB. While he was traded before the Astros' World Series championship run in 2017, he was awarded a World Series ring by the team by virtue of playing 70 games for them in 2017.

Toronto Blue Jays
On July 31, 2017, the Astros traded Aoki and Teoscar Hernández to the Toronto Blue Jays for Francisco Liriano. He was designated for assignment on August 28, 2017, and released the following day.

New York Mets
On September 2, 2017, the New York Mets signed Aoki to a major league contract. On October 30, 2017, Aoki was released.

Second stint with Tokyo Yakult Swallows
On January 30, 2018, Aoki signed a three-year deal to return to the Tokyo Yakult Swallows, where he spent the first eight years of his professional career. In early May, 2018, Aoki recorded his 4,000th at bat in NPB. With a .328 career batting average to that point, he then qualified as NPB's lifetime batting champion.

International career

2006 World Baseball Classic
Aoki was named to the Japanese national team for the first time in early 2006 for the inaugural World Baseball Classic. After being relegated to the bench and seeing little playing time in the first two rounds, he was named the starting center fielder in the semi-finals against South Korea and finals against Cuba, but went 0-for-4 in those two games and finished with just one hit in five at-bats in the tournament. Nevertheless, Japan defeated Cuba 10–6 in the finals to become the inaugural tournament champions.

2007 Asian Baseball Championship
Aoki played in the 2007 Asian Baseball Championship (which also functioned as the Asian qualifying tournament for the Beijing Olympics) as a member of the Japanese national team. Though he was 0-for-9 with one sacrifice bunt in the first two games against the Philippines and South Korea as Japan's No. 3 hitter, he went 3-for-4 with a double and a walk in a 10–2 mercy rule win in the final game against Taiwan, helping Japan clinch a berth in the upcoming Olympics.

2008 Beijing Olympics
Aoki played in all nine games in the 2008 Beijing Olympics as Japan's starting center fielder, batting in each of the first three spots in the order and hitting .294 (10-for-34) with seven RBI and scoring five runs. Japan dropped the semi-finals against South Korea, though, and despite a go-ahead three-run home run by Aoki in the third inning of the bronze medal match against the United States, Japan went on to lose 8–4 in a disappointing fourth-place finish behind South Korea, Cuba and the United States.

2009 World Baseball Classic
Aoki played in the World Baseball Classic for the second time in 2009, having no difficulty playing left field despite manning center field almost exclusively for the Swallows. He played in all nine games, hitting .324 (12-for-37) with seven RBI as Japan's No. 3 hitter, and had a pivotal role in Japan's repeat as tournament champions. Aoki was one of three outfielders named to the All-Tournament team.

2017 World Baseball Classic
Aoki played center field for Team Japan in the 2017 World Baseball Classic. His team finished 3rd.

Playing style

Hitting
Slotted into the 2-hole in front of former Tigers shortstop Takashi Toritani, Aoki became adept at hitting infield singles to the left side of the infield to get on base during his years at Waseda University. He carried that same approach into the pros, going the opposite way for infield hits and singles to left field so often that teams began employing an "Aoki Shift", with the third baseman playing shallow and the shortstop shading the 5-6 hole, until 2006.

Aoki has developed more power with each successive season and has now established himself as a legitimate middle-of-the-order threat that can pull the ball as well as hit for a high average (.333 career batting average as of May 13, 2009). He is known to be slightly unusual in that he has several different batting stances in his repertoire. While most players shape their mechanics to perfection, Aoki does not hesitate to switch from one stance to another when he runs into hitless stretches (though he holds his bat much more upright than he did earlier in his career). He has attested to the importance of lower body movement to his hitting in interviews. According to Statcast, Aoki's current batting stance positions his head closest to the assumed strikezone of any active player.

Fielding
On the defensive end, Aoki has earned a reputation as a superb center fielder with excellent instincts and range, winning three consecutive Golden Glove awards from 2006 to 2008 and leading all outfielders in the Central League putouts in 2006 and 2007. His throwing arm is fringe-average for a major league center fielder but accurate, and he has a quick release.
In his first MLB season, Aoki made nine putouts in a game while fielding the right field in the Brewers' win over the Reds on June 8, 2012, falling one catch shy of the National League record. The 9 putouts rank among the most by a Brewers outfielder in a game. He was known throughout the Brewers organization as a solid defender.

Personal life
Aoki is married to former Japanese broadcaster Sachi Ohtake with whom he has two children.

References

External links

 Career statistics - NPB.jp
Norichika Aoki – Tokyo Yakult Swallows Official Blog (Japanese)
Norichika Aoki, JapaneseBallPlayers.com

1982 births
Living people
Baseball players at the 2008 Summer Olympics
Houston Astros players
Japanese expatriate baseball players in Canada
Japanese expatriate baseball players in the United States
Kansas City Royals players
Major League Baseball outfielders
Major League Baseball players from Japan
Milwaukee Brewers players
New York Mets players
Nippon Professional Baseball outfielders
Nippon Professional Baseball Rookie of the Year Award winners
Northwest Arkansas Naturals players
Olympic baseball players of Japan
People from Miyazaki Prefecture
Sacramento River Cats players
San Francisco Giants players
Seattle Mariners players
Tacoma Rainiers players
Tokyo Yakult Swallows players
Toronto Blue Jays players
Waseda University alumni
Yakult Swallows players
2006 World Baseball Classic players
2009 World Baseball Classic players
2017 World Baseball Classic players